Autana may refer to:

Cerro Autana, a mountain (tepui) of the Guiana Shield in Venezuela
Autana River, a river in the middle Orinoco basin of Venezuela
Autana Municipality, a municipality of Amazonas state of Venezuela, of which Isla Ratón is the administrative centre
 Autana, a genus of cellar spiders

See also
 Autana a model of Toyota Land Cruiser